Johannes Årsjö (born 21 June 1985) is a Swedish strongman competitor.

Biography
Born in Västervik, Sweden, Årsjö came to international prominence after winning Sweden's Strongest Man in 2009 A series of top 10 finishes in international grands prix within both the Giants Live and Strongman Super Series circuits led to an invite to the 2008 and 2009 World's Strongest Man contests, but he failed to qualify for the finals on both occasions. Johannes was once again invited to the 2010 World's Strongest Man, but he was injured shortly before the qualifying heats began.

Strongman competition record
 2005
 3. - Norrköping's Strongest Man
 2007
 5. - Sweden's Strongest Man
 2008
 4. - Strongman Super Series 2008: Viking Power Challenge
 Q. - 2008 World's Strongest Man
 2009
 5. - Giants Live 2009: Mohegan Sun Grand Prix
 7. - Giants Live 2009: Stavanger (Viking Power Challenge)
 3. - Strongman Super Series 2009: Bucharest Grand Prix
 1. - Sweden's Strongest Man
 8. - Strongman Super Series 2009: Los Angeles Grand Prix
 7. - Strongman Super Series 2009: Gothenburg Grand Prix
 Q. - 2009 World's Strongest Man
 2010
 1. - Sweden's Strongest Man
 2. - Strongman Super Series 2010: Stavanger (Viking Power Challenge)
 3. - Giants Live 2010: Kiev
 Q. - 2010 World's Strongest Man
 2012
 1. Sweden's Strongest Man
 9. 2012 World's Strongest Man
 2013
 1. - Sweden's Strongest Man
 1. - Giants Live 2013: Norway
 8. - 2013 World's Strongest Man
 2014
 1. - Sweden's Strongest Man
 2. - Giants Live 2014: Sweden
 2. - Europe's Strongest Man
 2015
 1. - Sweden's Strongest Man
 2. - Giants Live 2015: Sweden
 2016
 1. - Sweden's Strongest Man
 2. - Europe's Strongest Man
 Q. - 2016 World's Strongest Man
 1. - Giants Live 2016: Sweden
 2017
 1. - Sweden's Strongest Man
 1. - Giants Live 2017: Sweden

References

External links 
 Johannes Årsjö - official site
 Johannes Årsjö - official blog

1985 births
Living people
Swedish strength athletes
Swedish powerlifters
21st-century Swedish people